Alex Browne (born 9 August 1992) is a former professional Australian rules footballer who played for the Essendon Football Club in the Australian Football League (AFL). Browne played for the Oakleigh Chargers in the TAC Cup. He was drafted by Essendon with pick 48 in the 2010 national draft and made his debut against  at the Melbourne Cricket Ground in round 11 of the 2011 AFL season. He was delisted in October 2015.

Browne, along with 33 other Essendon players, was found guilty of using a banned performance-enhancing substance, thymosin beta-4, as part of Essendon's sports supplements program during the 2012 season. He and his teammates were initially found not guilty in March 2015 by the AFL Anti-Doping Tribunal, but a guilty verdict was returned in January 2016 after an appeal by the World Anti-Doping Agency. He was suspended for two years which, with backdating, ended in November 2016; as a result, he served approximately fourteen months of his suspension.

Browne had signed for the Northern Blues in the Victorian Football League for the 2016 season before his suspension ended his 2016 season. He will join the club in 2017.

Statistics

|- style="background-color: #EAEAEA"
! scope="row" style="text-align:center" | 2011
|style="text-align:center;"|
| 24 || 2 || 0 || 0 || 4 || 4 || 8 || 1 || 3 || 0.0 || 0.0 || 2.0 || 2.0 || 4.0 || 0.5 || 1.5 || 0
|-
! scope="row" style="text-align:center" | 2012
|style="text-align:center;"|
| 24 || 6 || 3 || 2 || 45 || 37 || 82 || 19 || 7 || 0.5 || 0.3 || 7.5 || 6.2 || 13.7 || 3.2 || 1.2 || 0
|- style="background-color: #EAEAEA"
! scope="row" style="text-align:center" | 2013
|style="text-align:center;"|
| 24 || – || – || – || – || – || – || – || – || – || – || – || – || – || – || – || 0
|-
! scope="row" style="text-align:center" | 2014
|style="text-align:center;"|
| 24 || – || – || – || – || – || – || – || – || – || – || – || – || – || – || – || 0
|- style="background-color: #EAEAEA"
! scope="row" style="text-align:center" | 2015
|style="text-align:center;"|
| 24 || 3 || 1 || 0 || 15 || 12 || 27 || 9 || 4 || 0.3 || 0.0 || 5.0 || 4.0 || 9.0 || 3.0 || 1.3 || 0
|- class="sortbottom"
! colspan=3| Career
! 11
! 4
! 2
! 64
! 53
! 117
! 29
! 14
! 0.4
! 0.2
! 5.8
! 4.8
! 10.6
! 2.6
! 1.3
! 0
|}

References

External links

Essendon Football Club players
1992 births
Living people
Australian rules footballers from Victoria (Australia)
Oakleigh Chargers players
Australian sportspeople in doping cases
Bendigo Football Club players